The Carnaval del Pueblo is a festival celebrating Latin American culture, held in Burgess Park, London in the first week of August.

The carnival features a spectacular procession of exotic floats, costumes, musicians and dancers, making their way through London Bridge, along Borough High Street, Elephant and Castle and Walworth Road, finally arriving in Burgess Park.
The event incorporates elements of Latin American culture, featuring dance rhythms, food and music.
Throughout the day, a mixture of musicians perform on the four stages set up around the park. In 2006, there were appearances from Puerto Rican reggaeton star Andy Boy and the Colombian all-woman orchestra Canela, among many others. U.K Reggaeton acts Flow Latino & D-KeL performed at the Carnival Del Pueblo 2007, after which, they got widespread recognition, resulting in them forming their debut production and music video companies.
The festival has enabled both acts as well as other upcoming artists to champion Latin urban music in the U.K. and gain airplay at a number of radio stations and clubs in London.

In 2011, the carnival was cancelled due to public works in the park. The festival returned to Burgess Park in 2014.

See also
Culture of London

References

External links
Carnaval Del Pueblo official site

Festivals in London
Annual events in London
Parades in London
Latin American carnivals in the United Kingdom